Doug MacLeod  (13 October 1959 – 22 November 2021) was an Australian writer of books, television and theatre.

Television
MacLeod was a working writer for ABC Radio's comedy department in the 1980s, before spending two years as head writer of Network Ten's The Comedy Company. He was a writer on the sketch comedy programs  Fast Forward and Full Frontal. He was the script editor of Kath & Kim while the series aired on the ABC.

As a break from sketch comedy he co-wrote five episodes of SeaChange with Andrew Knight.

He co-wrote the animated children's series Dogstar which won him the inaugural John Hinde prize for science fiction in 2008. He also worked on series two in 2011 with co-writer Philip Dalkin.

In 2008 MacLeod won the Fred Parsons Award for Contribution to Australian Comedy at the Australian Writers' Guild Awards.

Theatre
MacLeod was the writer of Call Girl the Musical, with Tracy Harvey which performed two seasons in Melbourne.

With John Clarke, he co-wrote a musical adaptation of the children's book Snugglepot and Cuddlepie, titled The Adventures of Snugglepot & Cuddlepie and Little Ragged Blossom.

Books and published works
MacLeod wrote the following story books for children and young people:

 Sister Madge's Book of Nuns
 Siggy and Amber
 Tumble Turn
 Spiky Spunky, My Pet Monkey
 Leon Stumble's Book of Stupid Fairytales
 I'm Being Stalked by a Moon Shadow
 Kevin the Troll
 The Clockwork Forest
 My Extraordinary Life & Death
 The Life of a Teenage Body-snatcher
 The Shiny Guys
 Tigers on the Beach
 In the Garden of Bad Things

Death
MacLeod died in Melbourne on 22 November 2021, aged 62.

References

External links
 

1959 births
2021 deaths
21st-century Australian novelists
Australian children's writers
Australian male novelists
Writers from Melbourne
21st-century Australian male writers